The Rottenrow is a street in the Townhead district of Glasgow, Scotland. One of the oldest streets in the city, it was heavily redeveloped in the 20th century and is now enveloped by the University of Strathclyde's John Anderson Campus.

History

The Rottenrow is one of eight streets which formed the medieval burgh of Glasgow. It was recorded as le Ratonraw de Glasgw in 1283. The name is a common one in British towns and cities and literally means "rat row" (from Middle English ratton raw), suggesting a tumbledown row of houses infested with rats.

The original premises of the University of Glasgow were situated in the Rottenrow, in a building known as the "Auld Pedagogy".

Townhead was once a densely populated residential area, but in 1962 the Glasgow Corporation earmarked it for redevelopment as part of its policy of slum clearance. The tenements surrounding the Rottenrow were swept away to make room for the new University of Strathclyde, formed in 1964 from the Royal College of Science and Technology, and their inhabitants were moved into high rises.

The Rottenrow is perhaps best known as the site of the Royal Maternity Hospital, the birthplace of generations of Glaswegians. Opened in 1860 to replace an older maternity hospital in St Andrew's Square, it continued to function until 2001, when it was superseded by the Princess Royal building at the Glasgow Royal Infirmary. The University of Strathclyde subsequently purchased and demolished the hospital, turning it into a park, Rottenrow Gardens. A few parts of the building (namely, the entrance on the Rottenrow and the arch on North Portland Street) were spared destruction so that they could be incorporated into the design. The park's heritage is also recalled by a giant metal nappy pin, created by sculptor George Wyllie.

References

Streets in Glasgow
History of Glasgow